Paul Lake (1951-2022) was an American poet, essayist, and professor at Arkansas Tech University. Another Kind of Travel won the Porter Fund Award for Literary Excellence.
 In addition, he won the Richard Wilbur Award for poetry in 2006.

He graduated from Towson University with a B.A. and from Stanford University with an M.A. He had served as the poetry editor for First Things.

Works

Novel

Awards
Porter Fund Award for Literary Excellence (1988)
Richard Wilbur Award (2006)

References

External links
"Only Connect: A Conversation With Paul Lake", Perihelion, Joan Houlihan 
Guest Essayist: Paul Lake
"Laureate of the Plains: Timothy Murphy's Very Far North", Contemporary Poetry Review
Encyclopedia of Arkansas History & Culture entry
Reviews
Walking Backward

American male poets
Writers from Baltimore
Arkansas Tech University faculty
Towson University alumni
Stanford University alumni
Living people
1951 births